Zoodochos is a Greek term meaning "life-receiving". It refers to an attribute of the tomb of Christ, known as the Zoodochos Taphos in the Eastern Orthodox Church. The tomb of Christ is considered a symbol of the Resurrection in Eastern Christianity. The title zoodochos is occasionally applied to the Theotokos since church tradition teaches that she received the Life of Christ in her womb. The Church of St. Mary of the Spring in Istanbul is named Zoödochos Pege ("Life-giving Spring") and is dedicated to the Virgin.

The shrine and monastery of Zoodochos Pigi in eastern Greece is named after the tomb of Jesus.

Notes

References

External links

Eastern Orthodox spirituality
Modern Greek words and phrases
New Testament Greek words and phrases